WHLT (channel 22) is a television station in Hattiesburg, Mississippi, United States, affiliated with CBS and The CW Plus. The station is owned by Nexstar Media Group, and has studios on US 49 in Hattiesburg; its transmitter is located in unincorporated northeastern Forrest County.

Although identifying as a separate station in its own right, WHLT is considered a semi-satellite of sister station WJTV (channel 12) in Jackson. As such, it clears all network programming as provided through its parent and simulcasts most of WJTV's newscasts, but airs a separate offering of syndicated programming; there are also separate station identifications and local commercial inserts. WHLT's master control, as well as some internal operations, are housed at WJTV's studios on TV Road in southwest Jackson.

History
In the early 1980s, there was a need for a CBS affiliate in the Pine Belt region, as the four closest CBS affiliates to Hattiesburg, WJTV, WWL-TV in New Orleans, WHTV in Meridian, Mississippi, and WKRG in Mobile, all had signals that failed to provide at least a Grade B signal to the city proper.  The FCC had an allocation for channel 18 in Laurel and channel 22 in Hattiesburg, with WHTV's owner, Frank K. Spain via his company Central Television, sought the license for Hattiesburg's channel 22 slot, and Capital Television, owner of WJTV, sought Laurel's channel 18. In 1982, the FCC awarded the license to Capital Television, as the CBS agreed to an affiliation for the new channel. Delays occurred as Central Television appealed the FCC's licensing decision, and WJTV was sold to News-Press & Gazette Company one year later. By 1985, NPG agreed to purchase Spain's license for Hattiesburg's channel 22 with Spain taking a consulting fee by agreeing to help sign on the station, as NPG had, at that time, never built constructed a new TV station.

WHLT signed began programming on January 12, 1987, bringing CBS programming to the Pine Belt for the first time, as well as giving News Press & Gazette the opportunity to take advantage of local advertising and news opportunities in the Pine Belt region. It also allowed the Jackson-based station's signal coverage area to be expanded in Southeastern Mississippi.  Prior to its sign on, Hattiesburg's cable provider, UA-Columbia Cablevision, carried WJTV on its lineup, but due to marginal picture quality, the cable company switched to WKRG on September 5, 1986 after that station added a new relay, right as plans for WHLT were finalized. In 1993, News-Press & Gazette sold several of its outlets (including WHLT and WJTV) to the first incarnation of New Vision Television.

In turn, the company sold its entire station group to Ellis Communications in 1995. Ellis was subsequently merged into Raycom Media in 1996 after it was bought out by a media group led by the Retirement Systems of Alabama (who bought AFLAC's broadcasting group a few months earlier). In 1997, Media General acquired WHLT and WJTV (as well as Savannah, Georgia's WSAV-TV) from Raycom in a swap for Richmond, Virginia's WTVR-TV.

The trade was made in part due to Raycom's acquisition of rival WDAM-TV in Laurel and Federal Communications Commission (FCC) rules of the time did not permit duopolies. On April 16, 2009, WHLT "flash-cut" its signal after discontinuing analog broadcasts and began digital-only transmission. It originally applied to flash-cut earlier on February 17 but the FCC denied the station's request.

As part of a long-term affiliation renewal with The CW, Media General announced on December 23, 2014 that WHLT would add the network to their digital subchannel. This displaced The CW's previous home on WHPM-LD2. Comcast offers WHLT-DT2 in high definition on channel 1024 for Hattiesburg viewers. By spring 2017, the over-the-air feed for WHLT-DT2 was upgraded into 720p to allow for 16:9 high definition viewing for non-cable or satellite subscribers. The CW feed for WHLT is identical to that of sister station WJTV and is not the CW+ feed offered in similarly sized markets.

On January 27, 2016, Nexstar Broadcasting Group announced its acquisition of Media General; the deal was completed on January 17, 2017.

Subchannels
The station's digital signal is multiplexed:

Programming

Syndicated programming
Syndicated programming on WHLT includes Divorce Court, Family Feud and The Andy Griffith Show among others.

News operation

In February 1987, the station launched its fledgling two-man news operation, covering a major local news story, a deadly tornado in neighboring Jones County. That small beginning led to personnel growth and the production of half-hour newscasts airing weekdays at 6 and 10 p.m. This evolution grew out of the station's early practice of gathering local news stories and feeding them to sister station WJTV daily (via the back haul of a terrestrial microwave link) for inclusion in one block of WJTV's 6 and 10 p.m. newscasts. 
 
WHLT (in 1998) relaunched a full news department with shows known as 22 Daily News, had the same branding and slogan ("It's About Time") as the product at sister station WIAT in Birmingham, Alabama. Despite attaining decent ratings and winning numerous awards, it was unable to attract local advertising through consistent viewership. As a result, its newscasts were canceled after just two years.

As a semi-satellite of WJTV, WHLT simulcasts its parent outlet's weekday morning show.

In October 2013, WHLT began offering a thirty-minute local newscast which airs weeknights at 10 p.m. This program features full local news coverage of the Hattiesburg–Laurel market, anchored by Melanie Christopher, Byron Brown, and chief meteorologist Ken South. Content for the local newscast is collected by three local Hattiesburg journalists on the WHLT 22 team and is supplemented by news content from WJTV. During the second block, there is a local weather segment (branded as "Storm Team 22") focusing on the Pine Belt viewing area.

References

External links

WJTV website

Television channels and stations established in 1987
HLT
CBS network affiliates
Ion Television affiliates
Nexstar Media Group
1987 establishments in Mississippi